Castle Vale Town Football Club is a football club based in the Castle Vale area of Birmingham, England.

History
The club was established in 1998 as the reserve team of Castle Vale Kings Heath. They joined Division Three of the Midland Combination in 2003, and were runners-up in their first season, earning promotion to Division Two. In 2005 the team were renamed Castle Vale Reserves as the club changed its name, and in 2006 they became a separate club under the name Castle Vale JKS, JKS standing for Junior Kick Stars, the youth team that merged with the reserves to form a new club; a new Castle Vale reserve team was subsequently formed and joined Division Three of the Midland Combination in 2007.

The new Castle Vale JKS started in Division Three of the Midland Combination, but won the division at the first attempt. They went on to win Division Two and the league's Challenge Vase the following season. A third successive title and promotion was secured when they won Division One in 2008–09, with the club also winning the league's Challenge Cup, a trophy they won again in 2010–11. Although the club finished bottom of the Premier Division in 2011–12 and 2012–13, they were not relegated to Division One. However, they resigned from the league midway through the 2013–14 season.

The club was reformed as Castle Vale Town and in 2016 they joined the Division Three of the Midland League, formed in 2014 by a merger of the Midland Combination and the Midland Alliance. In their first season they finished bottom of Division Three.

Season-by-season record

Coaching staff

Honours
Midland Combination
Division One champions 2008–09
Division Two champions 2007–08
Division Three champions 2006–07
Challenge Cup winners 2008–09, 2010–11
Challenge Vase winners 2007–08

Records
Best FA Cup performance: Preliminary round, 2010–11
Best FA Vase performance: Second qualifying round 2009–10, 2012–13

References

External links
Official website

Football clubs in England
Football clubs in Birmingham, West Midlands
Football clubs in the West Midlands (county)
Association football clubs established in 1998
1998 establishments in England
Sport in Birmingham, West Midlands
Midland Football Combination
Midland Football League